Al Ahli Bank of Kuwait (ABK) is a retail and commercial bank located in Kuwait City, founded in 1967. The services are provided via 31 branches in Kuwait, 2 branches in the United Arab Emirates (Abu Dhabi and Dubai) and 43 branches in Egypt.

In 2016 ABK was the 10th on the List of the 50 safest banks in the Middle East by the Global Finance magazine.

Together with Emirates, the largest airline in the Middle East, they offer to passengers various types of Visa credit and prepaid cards.

See also 

List of banks in Kuwait
List of banks in Asia

References

External links 
Homepage
Al Ahli Bank of Kuwait Headquarters photos
Profile on Reuters
Profile on Zawya

Banks of Kuwait
Banks established in 1967
1967 establishments in Kuwait
Companies based in Kuwait City
Kuwaiti companies established in 1967
Companies listed on the Boursa Kuwait